Loomio is decision-making software and web service designed to assist groups with collaborative, consensus-focused decision-making processes. It is a free software web application, where users can initiate discussions and put up proposals.  As the discussions progress to initiating a proposal, the group receives feedback through an updatable pie chart or other data visualizations. Loomio is basically a web based forum (has optional email delivery interface) with tools to facilitate conversations and decision making processes from starting and holding conversations to reaching outcome.

Loomio was built by a small core group of developers, based out of Wellington, New Zealand. Most of the work was made by this core group but more than 70 contributors from around the world participated occasionally with small contribution.

In 2014, Loomio raised over $100,000 via a Crowdfunding effort to develop Loomio 1.0. The Loomio web interface supports mobile access and other enhancements. As of 2016, Loomio was used in more than 100 countries, with the software being translated into 35 languages.

History 

Loomio emerged from the Occupy movement. In 2012, it launched its first prototype. It was utilized in the Occupy movement in New Zealand. After using the first prototype in this, the team behind Loomio felt that it would be easier to give everyone a voice with an online software, leading to the launch of Loomio 1.0. Since the launch of Loomio 1.0, Loomio has stopped using occupy hand-signals in the interface. It has since been developed into a social enterprise as Loomio Cooperative Limited. and linked to the popular trend of "platform cooperativism" and targeting also mainstream markets.

Operation 

The top-level organizational structure in Loomio is the group. A group is made up of members, who are granted permission to that group. Groups can be both public and private, permitting for both privacy and transparency.

Within the groups, members create discussions on specific topics. During a discussion, members of the group post comments and create proposals.

Proposals solicit feedback from members on a specific proposition.  Members can either agree, disagree, abstain, or block. Blocking is essentially a strong form of disagreement.

Funding 

Loomio is funded through contracts with government and business, and donations from its users.

Reception 

Loomio has been used by the Wellington City Council for discussion with their citizens.

The Pirate Party of Hellas used Loomio to create 461 groups, covering 18 federal departments, 13 regions of Greece, 23 prefectures, and hundreds of counties and municipalities.  The Internet Party of New Zealand also used Loomio to develop policy during the campaign for the 2014 General Election.

El Partido Pirata de Chile has also adopted Loomio through their own fork called Lumio, offering a slightly different translation into Spanish for the voting  options aiming at both remarking the importance of consensus and improving language style by using verbs in the first person singular (Concuerdo, Discrepo, Me abstengo y Solicito Reformular).  Additionally, the PPCL has promoted the use of Lumio in different areas of political discussion and group coordination inside and outside the Party.

Loomio won the MIX Prize Digital Freedom Challenge in April 2014.

Product Overview 
There are three target items Loomio utilizes to create its collaborative working environment:

Groups: Within the "group" settings, administrators are able to manage the membership of its users and grant access of controls to specific employees, create subgroups  of which managers allocate break out rooms to specific departments, and utilize other applications simultaneously with Loomio's active integration system.

EU specific 
Loomio has committed to address the needs and regulations of the EU market. In 2018 the EU General Data Protection Regulation (GDPR) came into effect and Loomio confirmed that it is GDPR compliant. In 2019 Loomio started planning a Loomio.eu service to use EU based hosting in response to requests from EU users.

Integrations 
Recent versions include more features of integration with other software. It is possible to connect Loomio group notifications to Slack, Microsoft Teams and Mattermost. It is also possible to add a Single Sign On (SSO) using central authentication provider like Microsoft Azure Active Directory.

Projects using Loomio 
Prominent projects that have used Loomio for collaborative work based on democratic process:

 2013: Diaspora*
 2014: Real democracy
 2015: Podemos (Spanish political party)
 2016: Students for Cooperation
 2020: The Apache Software Foundation as of early 2020
 2020: Consultative Council (Poland)
 2020: Pirate Party of Belgium

See also
Collaborative software
Deliberative democracy
E-democracy
E-participation
Online consultation
Online deliberation
Public sphere

References

External links 
 
 
 Free Software Directory entry

Free software
Decision-making software
Social enterprises
Software using the GNU AGPL license
Software companies of New Zealand
2012 software
Cooperatives in New Zealand